The 2000 CONCACAF Women's Gold Cup was the fifth staging of the CONCACAF Women's Gold Cup, and the first after being rebranded as the Women's Gold Cup. Brazil and China PR were guests.

UNCAF qualifying

in Guatemala

3rd-place match

Final

Guatemala and Costa Rica qualified for Gold Cup 2000

Final tournament

First round

Group A

Group B

Knockout stage

Bracket

Semifinals

3rd-place match

Final

Awards

Goalscorers

External links
2000 CONCACAF Women's Gold Cup at RSSSF

CONCACAF Women's Championship tournaments
Women's Gold Cup
Women's Gold Cup
History of the United States women's national soccer team
2000
CON
CONCACAF Women's Gold Cup
CONCACAF Women's Gold Cup
CONCACAF Women's Gold Cup
July 2000 sports events in the United States